Vicious Circle is a single British television crime drama film, written by former Tomorrow's World presenter Kieran Prendiville, that first broadcast on BBC1 on 9 February 1999. Based loosely on The General by Irish journalist Paul Williams, Vicious Circle follows notorious Irish criminal Martin Cahill as he undertakes a high stakes jewellery robbery, stealing loot worth more than a million pounds. The film was directed by David Blair.

The film was released on DVD via Just Entertainment in the Netherlands in 2004, but this remains the only home video release to date.

Production
When questioned about the film's similarities to The General and Ordinary Decent Criminal, producer Sue Austen emphasised; "Ours isn't just the Martin Cahill story. It's a story about a Dublin gangster coming up against an IRA operative and a policeman, both of whom we've invented, and the three of them constantly circling each other. It doesn't deal with any of the events of his earlier life. We start at the time of the O'Connor's raid, and go straight down the line with an exciting piece of drama. We've compressed the events, going through the whole Kilakee episode, up to his death and our other characters' reaction to it."

Reception
James Rampton from The Independent gave the film a positive review, writing; "Ken Stott has just the right screen presence for the role of Cahill. He brings a sense of wordless menace to the character without making him a cardboard cut-out baddie. He makes Cahill a man who cares deeply for his pigeons and at the same time is capable of cold-bloodedly nailing a traitor's hands to the floor."

Cast
 Ken Stott as Martin Cahill
 Gerard McSorley as Crowley
 Andrew Connolly as Detective Declan Finney
 John Kavanagh as IRA Chief Charlie Rice
 Art Malik as Harrison
 Michelle Fairley as Frances
 Michael Liebmann as Barry 
 Norman Rodway as Hagarty
 Luke Griffin as Molloy
 Cathy White as Tina
 Tommy O'Neill	as Gene
 Pat Ainscough as Arthur
 Stuart Dunne as Niall
 Owen O'Gorman	as Austin
 Breffni McKenna as Clive
 Pat Kinevane as Pat

References

External links

BBC television dramas
1999 films
1999 television films
1999 crime drama films
Television shows set in Ireland
English-language television shows
British crime drama films
Films directed by David Blair (director)
1990s British films
British drama television films
1990s English-language films